Chimney Point is a census-designated place (CDP) in the town of New Milford, Litchfield County, Connecticut, United States. It is in the southwest corner of the town, on a peninsula of the same name on the east side of Candlewood Lake. It is bordered to the south by Candlewood Lake Club.

Chimney Point was first listed as a CDP prior to the 2020 census.

References 

Census-designated places in Litchfield County, Connecticut
Census-designated places in Connecticut